"Upsidaisium" is the first story arc from the second season of Rocky and His Friends. With 36 segments it was the second-longest of all Rocky and Bullwinkle story arcs, and concerns Rocky and Bullwinkle's efforts to reclaim Bullwinkle's Uncle's Upsidaisium mine. It was broadcast on ABC during the 1960–1961 television season on Sundays, concurrently with Metal-Munching Mice on Thursdays.

Plot synopsis 
Bullwinkle receives a letter informing him that his uncle Dewlap has passed on, leaving him a mine located on Mt. Flatten. Rocky and Bullwinkle set out to find it, and soon discover that they're being monitored by not only Boris Badenov and Natasha Fatale, but their old friend Captain Peter "Wrong Way" Peachfuzz, the new head of G-2. Peachfuzz has been sent to make sure Rocky and Bullwinkle find Mt. Flatten, as its ore, the anti-gravity metal Upsidaisium, is much sought after by the U.S. government. While under the guise of a pair of prospectors, Boris and Natasha manage to help Rocky and Bullwinkle locate Mt. Flatten, which floats high in the air due to the high amount of Upsidaisium within it. Once they reach the mountain, Boris and Natasha are joined by their intimidating superior, Mr. Big, who tells them that Pottsylvania also seeks Upsidaisium as a means to eliminate a traffic problem (by building cars with the anti-gravity ore). Eventually, thanks to Rocky's ingenuity, Mt. Flatten is transported to Washington D.C., and the Upsidaisium is put under lock and key by the government. Unfortunately, Boris attempts to smuggle the precious metal out of the government's reach, even going so far as to disguise himself as a U.S. general. Rocky and Bullwinkle are cornered by Mr. Big, but when they attack him, they find that he's really a very tiny individual. Mr. Big escapes into an Upsidaisium vault, and Boris and Natasha are put under arrest. Seizing a bit of Upsidaisium and using Rocky as a hostage, Mr. Big attempts to escape but is carried into the air by his ill-gotten gains, never to be seen again, resulting in another happy ending for our heroes.

Episode segments

Episode 1 
 Upsidaisium
 Aesop and Son: The Hares and the Frog
 Mr. Know-It-All: How To Remove a Moustache (without Getting Any Lip)
 Dudley Do-Right: The Centaur
 Big Bomb at Frostbite Falls or The Exploding Metropolis

Episode 2 
 The Road to Ruin or Mine Over Matter
 Fractured Fairy Tales: Androcles and the Lion
 Mr. Know-It-All: Falling Asleep on the Job Can Lead to a Rude Awakening or Don't Be a Somnambulist Chaser
 Peabody's Improbable History: Louis Pasteur
 Two Flying Ghosts or High Spirits

Episode 3 
 Crash Drive or Oedipus Wrecks
 Fractured Fairy Tales: King Midas
 Mr. Know-It-All: How to Remove an Unwanted Guest From Your Home (and Make More Living Room)
 Dudley Do-Right: Railroad Tracks
 Fender Benders or The Asphalt Bungle

Episode 4 
 Burning Sands or The Big Hot Foot
 Aesop and Son: The Frogs and the Beaver
 Mr. Know-It-All: How To Be a Star Reporter
 Peabody's Improbable History: Robin Hood
 Death in the Desert or A Place in the Sun

Episode 5 
 The Boy Bounders or Plane Punchy
 Fractured Fairy Tales: Riding Hoods Anonymous
 Mr. Know-It-All: How To Do Stunts In The Movies (without Having the Usher Throw You Out!)
 Peabody's Improbable History: Robinson Crusoe
 A Peek at the Peak or Your Climb is my Climb

Episode 6 
 You've Got a Secret or Out of Sight, Out of Mine
 Fractured Fairy Tales: The Ugly Duckling
 Bullwinkle's Corner: "Rockabye Baby"
 Peabody's Improbable History: Ponce de León
 Boris and the Blade or Shiek Rattle and Roll

Episode 7 
 Sourdough Squirrel or Hardrock Rocky
 Fractured Fairy Tales: Hansel and Gretel
 Mr. Know-It-All: How To Run the 4 Minute Mile in 10 Seconds
 Dudley Do-Right: Foreclosing Mortgages
 A Creep at the Switch or Sudden Pacific

Episode 8 
 The Train on the Plane or The Overland Express
 Fractured Fairy Tales: Cinderella Returns
 Bullwinkle's Corner: "The Village Blacksmith" by Longfellow
 Peabody's Improbable History: John L. Sullivan
 Danger in the Desert or Max Attacks

Episode 9 
 The Missing Mountain or Peek-a-Boo Peak
 Aesop and Son: The Lion and the Aardvark
 Mr. Know-It-All: How To Be a Big Game Hunter
 Peabody's Improbable History: Leonardo da Vinci
 Go Down Mooses or The Fall Guy

Episode 10 
 Rocky and the Rock or Braver and Boulder
 Aesop and Son: The Jackrabbits and the Mule
 Bullwinkle's Corner: "The Childrens Hour"
 Dudley Do-Right: Snidely Mounted Police
 Mountain Mover or Boris Sneaks a Peak

Episode 11 
 Bullwinkle's Rise or This Goon For Higher
 Fractured Fairy Tales: The Goose and the Golden Egg
 Mr. Know-It-All: How To Be a Barber (or 10 Ways to Clip Your Fellow Man)
 Peabody's Improbable History: Paul Revere
 Boris Bites Back or Rebel Without a Pause

Episode 12 
 Bullwinkle at the Bottom or A Mish-Mash Moose
 Fractured Fairy Tales: Three Little Pigs
 Bullwinkle's Corner: "The Barefoot Boy"
 Dudley Do-Right: Mother Love
 Double Trouble or The Moose Hangs High

Episode 13 
 Jet Jockey Rocky or One Point Landing
 Aesop and Son: The Dog and his Shadow
 Mr. Know-It-All: How To Water Ski or 5 Steps To Easy Drowning
 Peabody's Improbable History: Confucius
 Plots and Plans or Too Many Crooks

Episode 14 
 The Cliff Hangar or Taken for Granite
 Fractured Fairy Tales: The Pied Piper
 Bullwinkle's Corner: "The Raven" by Edgar Allan Poe
 Dudley Do-RIght: Mountie Bear
 Supersonic Boom or The Old Mount's A-Moverin'

Episode 15 
 The Big Blast or A Many Splintered Thing
 Fractured Fairy Tales: Slipping Beauty
 Mr. Know-It-All: How To Be An Indian In One Easy Lesson or You Can Be a Tonto...Pronto
 Peabody's Improbable History: Nero
 The Steal Hour or A Snitch In Time

Episode 16 
 Verse without Werse or Crime Without Rhyme
 Fractured Fairy Tales: Snow White Inc.
 Bullwinkle's Corner: "Woodman, Spare That Tree"
 Peabody's Improbable History: Captain Matthew Clift
 Truckdrivers in the Sky or Follow the Fleet

Episode 17 
 The Squirrel Next Door or High Neighbor
 Aesop and Son: The Cat and Fifteen Mice
 Mr. Know-It-All: How To Own a Hi-Fi (on a Low Income and I.Q.)
 Peabody's Improbable History: Vasco Núñez de Balboa
 The Spell Binders or Hex Marks the Spot

Episode 18 
 Battle Of the Giants or It Takes Two to Tangle
 Fractured Fairy Tale: Rumplestiltskin Returns
 Bullwinkle's Corner: "Excelsior" by Longfellow
 Dudley Do-Right: Inspector Dudley Do-Right
 Bye-Bye, Boris or Farewell, My Ugly

See also 
List of fictional elements, materials, isotopes and atomic particles

References

External links 
 Rocky and His Friends at IMDB

The Adventures of Rocky and Bullwinkle and Friends episodes
1960 American television episodes
1961 American television episodes
Fictional materials